The WBSC Oceania, formerly known as Baseball Confederation of Oceania (abbreviated as BCO), is the governing body of baseball and softball within Oceania, and is responsible for the Oceania Baseball Championship.

The Baseball Confederation of Oceania was established in 1989, it currently has 14 member nations. Not all member nations are represented in the executive committee which creates conflict within the region. The lesser countries tend not to support regional tournaments which contributes negatively to the growth of the sport in the region.

Ray Brown, the BCO Development Officer, provides support throughout the region.

Since 2006, the BCO has run a Regional Training Centre for aspiring players. Run for approximately 10 days, the RTC is open to players 14-18 who want to perform at a higher level. In 2006, the RTC was held in Auckland, New Zealand. In 2007, it was held in Christchurch, New Zealand.

History
Baseball arrived in most parts of Oceania as a result of Japanese influence prior to and during World War II, and American influence, particularly following the war. The Japanese influenced was most pronounced in Micronesia, particularly Palau.

The Baseball Confederation of Oceania was established in 1989, it currently has 14 member nations.

The organisation adopted a policy of sharing the rights to hold BCO Tournaments between the northern and southern Oceania areas, on an alternative basis. Either New Zealand or Australia should hold the 18U BCO playoffs in 2015 since Guam held them in 2012. It is likely that New Zealand will hold this tournament due to the cancelling of the 15U tournament which was to be held in Auckland, New Zealand early in 2015. The cancellation was of huge disappointment to the New Zealand Baseball organisation and community. The game in New Zealand is growing significantly, which is important for the overall region and Baseball NZ had organised the local cable television company SkyTV to show some of the games lives to boost the sports profile.

Members

Baseball

Softball

WBSC World Rankings

Baseball

Softball

Baseball5

Historical leaders
Highest Ranked Oceania member in the WBSC Rankings

Men's baseball

Women's baseball

Men's softball

Women's softball

See also
Oceania Softball Confederation
Oceania Baseball Championship
Baseball at the Pacific Games

References

External links
Confederation of Oceania

Baseball governing bodies
Sports governing bodies in Oceania
Sports organizations established in 1989
Baseball in Oceania
Oceania